Oecomys roberti, also known as Robert's oecomys or Robert's arboreal rice rat, is a rodent species from South America in the genus Oecomys. It has a broad distribution in the Amazon biome, being found in Bolivia, Brazil, French Guiana, Guyana, Peru, Suriname and Venezuela.

References

Literature cited
 Costa, L., Weksler, M. and Bonvicino, C. 2008. . In IUCN. IUCN Red List of Threatened Species. Version 2009.2. <www.iucnredlist.org>. Downloaded on December 2, 2009.

Oecomys
Rodents of South America
Mammals of Bolivia
Mammals of Brazil
Mammals of French Guiana
Mammals of Guyana
Mammals of Peru
Mammals of Suriname
Mammals of Venezuela
Mammals described in 1904
Taxa named by Oldfield Thomas